São José ("Saint Joseph") is a bairro in the District of Sede in the municipality of Santa Maria, in the Brazilian state of Rio Grande do Sul. It is located in east Santa Maria.

Villages 
The bairro contains the following villages: Jardim Lindóia, Loteamento Barroso, Parque do Sol, São José, Vila Farroupilha, Vila Figueira, Vila Sarandi, Vila Sargento Dornelles.

References 

Bairros of Santa Maria, Rio Grande do Sul